Eric Assmus ( died 1937/1939, literally Erih Asmus) was a Soviet diplomat of German descent.

Preceded by Boris Shtein, Assmus was Ambassador to Finland from 1935 to 1937. He contacted Finnish Prime Minister Toivo Kivimäki on 15 June 1935 that "in case of a military conflict in the Mainland Europe, the Soviet Union could be forced to occupy some parts of Finland". On 10 February 1936, Kivimäki reported his private conversation with Assmus to Juho Kusti Paasikivi:"in case Germany starts a war to any direction, Russia is forced to annihilate Finland to defuse it. It is possible that the enemy great power could use Finland to attack Russia, and to prevent this Russia have to occupy Finland. According to Russian military experts this would happen in days".

After Assmus left Helsinki, he was arrested and executed by the NKVD during the Great Purge. In 1938, the NKVD agent Boris Yartsev started unsuccessful negotiations between Finland and the Soviet Union.

References

Ambassadors of the Soviet Union to Finland
Great Purge victims from Germany
Executed Soviet people
Soviet people of German descent
Year of birth missing
1930s deaths
Year of death uncertain